The Viking Museum is a small underground museum in central Aarhus, Denmark. It is located at Sankt Clemens Torv (square of St. Clement), beneath the Nordea bank building. The Viking Museum is administered by the Moesgård Museum and financed by both Aarhus Municipality and Nordea.

History
The museum was established in 1968, after archaeologists from the Moesgård Museum had excavated the site in 1963-1964 in connection with the construction of an office building.  The museum underwent a renovation in 2008.

The Viking Museum is in situ, ie. situated upon the very site of the archaeological excavations it exhibits. The museum provides information regarding the history of Viking Age Aarhus in general and also features copies of items on display at the much larger Moesgaard Museum to the south of Aarhus.

Gallery

See also
Viking Ship Museum (Roskilde)
Viking Ship Museum (Oslo)

References

External links

 Viking Museum website Moesgård Museum 

Museums in Aarhus
Museums in the Central Denmark Region
Viking Age museums
Tourist attractions in Aarhus
Archaeological museums in Denmark
Museums established in 1968
1968 establishments in Denmark